Kyrgyzstan Air Company, operating as Air Kyrgyzstan (Eýr Kyrgyzstan Aviakompaniýasy; , Aviakompaniya «Air Kyrgyzstan»), is the flag carrier of Kyrgyzstan based in Bishkek. It operates scheduled domestic and international services to 13 destinations, as well as charter services. Its main hub is Manas International Airport in Bishkek, with a hub at Osh Airport in Osh.

The owner of 100% of the shares is the Government of the Kyrgyz Republic, represented by the Fund for State Property Management under the Government of the Kyrgyz Republic.

The airline along with all airlines based in Kyrgyzstan are on the list of air carriers banned in the European Union.

History 

The airline was founded in April 2001 as Altyn Air. It was rebranded as Kyrgyzstan Air Company on 28 July 2006, after taking over former national carrier Kyrgyzstan Airlines.

On December 5, 2013, the airline was re-registered as ”Air Kyrgyzstan” Open Joint Stock Company.

Destinations 
Air Kyrgyzstan OJSC has 60 frequencies and licenses in the following areas:

As of May 2015, Air Kyrgyzstan operates scheduled passenger flights to the following destinations:

As of May 2020, Air Kyrgyzstan does not operate any flights due to an unknown cause.

Codeshare agreements
Air Kyrgyzstan has codeshare agreements with the following airlines at April 2014:
 Turkish Airlines (Star Alliance)

Fleet

Current fleet
The Air Kyrgyzstan fleet consists of the following aircraft (as of February 2017):

Former fleet
The airline previously operated the following aircraft:
 1 Boeing 737-300
 Antonov An-24
 Tupolev Tu-134
 Tupolev Tu-154
 Yakovlev Yak-40
 1 Airbus A320

Accidents
On December 28, 2011, Air Kyrgyzstan Tupolev Tu-134, registration EX-020, operating flight QH3 from Bishkek to Osh, Kyrgyzstan, with 73 passengers and 6 crew suffered a hard landing on Osh's runway 12 resulting in the collapse of the right main gear, right wing separation and the aircraft rolling on its back in fog and low visibility. The aircraft came to a stop on soft ground about 10 meters off the right runway edge. A fuel leak from the left wing led to a fire erupting which was quickly extinguished by airport emergency services. One passenger received serious injuries and 24 people received minor injuries (concussions, bruises), of which 16 were taken to local hospitals.

References

External links

  Official website
  "28 декабря Ту-134А-3 EX020." Interstate Aviation Committee

2006 establishments in Kyrgyzstan
Airlines established in 2006
Airlines of Kyrgyzstan
Transport in Bishkek
Airlines banned in the European Union